Bangladesh Folk Arts and Crafts Foundation is a government foundation that is responsible for the preservation of; and arrange training programmes on arts and crafts, and the setting up of folk art museum in Bangladesh and is located in Sonargaon, Narayanganj, Bangladesh.

History

The foundation was established in July 1975. It was amended through the Bangladesh Folk Art and Crafts Foundation Act in parliament. The minister of cultural affairs. It holds a yearly month long fair celebrating folk art. It also holds fair every Bengali New Year.

References

Organisations based in Narayanganj
Government agencies of Bangladesh
1975 establishments in Bangladesh
Folk art